Drew Daniel Walsh Brierley (born 27 February 1997) is an English former first-class cricketer.

Brierley was born at Kettering in February 1997. He was educated at Wellingborough School, before going up to Anglia Ruskin University. While studying at Anglia Ruskin, he made two appearances in first-class cricket for Cambridge MCCU against Nottinghamshire in 2016 and Essex in 2018, scoring 12 runs. In addition to playing first-class cricket, Brierley has also played minor counties cricket for Bedfordshire.

Notes and references

External links

1997 births
Living people
People from Kettering
People educated at Wellingborough School
Alumni of Anglia Ruskin University
English cricketers
Cambridge MCCU cricketers
Bedfordshire cricketers